The Lovers, Idyll on a Bridge or Autumn Evening is an 1888 oil on canvas painting by French artist Émile Friant (1863–1932). It is now in the Musée des beaux-arts de Nancy.

References

1888 paintings
Paintings in the Museum of Fine Arts of Nancy
French paintings